Maurice Lamont Ffrench (born January 1, 1999) is an American football wide receiver who is currently a member of the Edmonton Elks.

Early life and education
Ffrench was born on January 1, 1999, in New Brunswick, New Jersey. He attended New Brunswick High School, playing running back, wide receiver, cornerback, and returner there. He ran for 1,375 yards on 106 carries (12.9 average), caught 28 passes for 727 yards, and scored 24 total touchdowns (15 rushing, five receiving, two on kickoff returns and two by punt returns). After spending all four years of high school as team captain, Ffrench accepted a scholarship offer from University of Pittsburgh to play for their Panther football team.

As a true freshman, Ffrench appeared in nine games as a two-way player. He started the season as reserve wide receiver and later played defensive back, when multiple players were injured. He scored two touchdowns in the season, including one on a 77-yard rush against Syracuse. On defense he made two tackles, both coming against Syracuse. He played in all twelve games as a sophomore, starting five and placing third on the team in receptions (25) and receiving yards (272).

As a junior, Ffrench played in 14 games, starting six as a receiver. He totaled 10 touchdowns on rushes, receptions, and kick returns. He made a season-long 78-yard receiving touchdown against Virginia Tech. He also made a 99-yard kick return touchdown against Notre Dame. He led his conference in kick return yards and touchdowns, earning honorable mention All-ACC. Ffrench had his best season as a senior, compiling 96 receptions for 850 yards and four touchdowns, earning honorable mention All-ACC honors.

Professional career

Kansas City Chiefs
After going unselected in the 2020 NFL Draft, Ffrench was signed by the Kansas City Chiefs as an undrafted free agent. He was waived at roster cuts and re-signed to the practice squad the next day. He was released again at the following year's roster cuts, being signed again to the practice squad. He was released from the practice squad on September 13, 2021.

Los Angeles Chargers
Two days after being released, Ffrench was signed by the Los Angeles Chargers. He was elevated to the active roster prior to their week nine game against the Philadelphia Eagles, in which he appeared on one play. He signed a reserve/future contract with the Chargers on January 11, 2022. He was waived on August 15, 2022.

References

Further reading

1998 births
Living people
Players of American football from New Jersey
Pittsburgh Panthers football players
American football wide receivers
American football cornerbacks
Kansas City Chiefs players
Los Angeles Chargers players
American football return specialists
Sportspeople from New Brunswick, New Jersey